Adam M. Zucker (born October 27, 1976) is a sportscaster who works for CBS Sports and CBS Sports Network. He has been with CBS Sports Network since 2003 as the College Sports Television anchor.

Early life and education
Zucker is a native of Mountain Lakes, New Jersey, and a 1994 graduate of Mountain Lakes High School, which inducted him into its hall of fame in 2016. He graduated from Syracuse University's S. I. Newhouse School of Public Communications in 1998 with a degree in broadcast journalism.

Career
Zucker began his career as a sideline reporter and as an on-site host for football games for the Syracuse Radio Network. He also worked as a sports reporter and sports anchor for local television stations: WBRE-TV and was a sports reporter at WTVH-TV.

CBS Sports
Zucker is a studio host for CBS Sports and CBS Sports Network, hosting College Football Today, Inside College Football, Inside College Basketball and providing in-studio updates during the NCAA Tournament, among other things. He has also called CBS Sports Spectacular's coverage of the College Home Run Derby. He also hosts Inside College Football and Inside College Basketball for the CBS Sports Network.  Beginning in 2011, he filled in for Tim Brando in the CBS studios while Brando is in the on site game booth with Steve Beuerlein. Zucker does CBS studio hosting for the College World Series, NCAA Men's Basketball Championship, Men's and Women's lacrosse championship, and narrates many of the network's other original programs and documents.

Beginning in 2014, he was named studio host for the SEC on CBS, replacing longtime anchor Tim Brando who left for Fox Sports/Fox Sports 1. Beginning in 2015, he is named the fill-in studio host of College Basketball on CBS, when fellow CBS colleague Greg Gumbel, is on assignment.

Personal life
Zucker lives in Summit, New Jersey with his wife and their two children.

References

External links
CBS Profile

1976 births
American television sports anchors
Lacrosse announcers
College basketball announcers in the United States
College football announcers
College baseball announcers in the United States
Living people
Mountain Lakes High School alumni
People from Mountain Lakes, New Jersey
People from Summit, New Jersey
Sportspeople from Morris County, New Jersey
American television sports announcers
S.I. Newhouse School of Public Communications alumni